Lorin is a masculine given name. The meaning of Lorin derives from a bay or laurel plant; of Laurentum (wreathed/crowned with laurel). Laurentum, in turn is from laurus (laurel), from the place of laurel trees, laurel branch, laurel wreath. Laurentum was also a city in ancient Italy.  

Notable people with the name include:

Lorin Blodget (1823–1901), American physicist and writer
Lorin Farr (1820–1909), Mormon pioneer and the first mayor of Ogden, Utah
Lorin Maazel (1930–2014), conductor, violinist and composer
Lorin Morgan-Richards (1975), author and illustrator
Lorin J. Mullins (1917–1993), American biophysicist
Lorin Solon (1892–1967), All-American football player
Lorin C. Woolley (1856–1934), Mormon fundamentalist leader and a proponent of plural marriage
Lorin F. Wheelwright (1909–1987), American Latter-day Saint hymnwriter, composer, musical instructor and educator

Surname
Those with Lorin as a surname include:
René Lorin (1877–1933), inventor of the ramjet (patented in 1908)

See also
Fondation Lorin, arts centre on the Rue Es-Siaghine in Tangier, Morocco
James Lorin Richards House, historic house at 47 Kirkstall and 22 Oakwood Roads in Newton, Massachusetts
Kronach Lorin, small ramjet engine for aircraft propulsion, statically tested in Vienna during  World War II
Lorin District, Berkeley, California
Lorin Griset Academy, continuation high school in the Santa Ana Unified School District in Orange County, California